Roccascalegna is a comune and town in the province of Chieti, part of the Abruzzo region of Italy.

Main sights
Medieval village 
  Castle of Roccascalegna 
Church of San Pietro.
Abbey of San Pancrazio, opened in 1205

References

Sources

External links 
Official website